The Bust of Auguste Rodin was sculpted by the French artist Camille Claudel in 1888-1889 as a tribute to her teacher and lover, Auguste Rodin.

Casts
A bronze cast of the work was displayed in the 1892 Salon de la Société Nationale des Beaux–Arts on the Champ de Mars to critical acclaim.

See also
List of sculptures by Camille Claudel
Bust of Auguste Rodin (Bourdelle)

References

External links

1889 sculptures
Bronze sculptures
Sculptures by Camille Claudel
Cultural depictions of Auguste Rodin